Luluk Purwanto or Purwanto (born 25 June 1959) is an Indonesian jazz violinist who extends the violin's sound with her voice. She has recorded since the 1980s. She has lived in the Netherlands and in Germany.

Life

Purwanto was born in the Indonesian city of Surakarta in 1959. Her parents were Aysha Gani and Julian Purwanto who were both musicians. She took lessons in classical violin. She has studied at the Arts Institute in Yogyakarta in Java and thanks to a scholarship from the Australia Embassy, at the Sydney Conservatorium of Music.

She is married to a Dutchman named Rene van Helsdingen and they lived and worked together in the Netherlands. The trio that she played with was called the Helsdingen Trio

In 1985 she appeared at the North Sea Jazz Festival in The Hague in 1985 as a member of the Indonesian band Bhaskara.

Luluk is credited with Bhaskara as the composer for Seputar Indonesia theme music.

She has lived in Munich in Germany.

In 2006 Purwanto awarded the prize the New Generation Jazz Award for the best young jazz musician at JakArt@2006 to Quicky.

Selected discography
 Luluk - Aysha (Luluk Purwanto & the Helsdingen trio), 2007
"Impression of a tour"/ Mahabharata Jazz and Wayang, 2004
Luluk - Brushes  the CD & the Clip, 2003
Luluk  -Born Free-, 
FILM2000, 2000
LuLuK PuRwAntO & ThE HeLsdinGeN TriO - The Stage Bus, 1994
Impressions of Indonesia, 1986

References

1959 births
Living people
People from Surakarta
Jazz violinists
21st-century violinists